Cyclin-A1 is a protein that in humans is encoded by the CCNA1 gene.

Function 

The protein encoded by this gene belongs to the highly conserved cyclin family, whose members are characterized by a dramatic periodicity in protein abundance through the cell division cycle. Cyclins function as activating subunits of enzymatic complex together with cyclin-dependent kinases (CDKs). Different cyclins exhibit distinct expression and degradation patterns that contribute to the temporal coordination of cell cycle events. Cyclin A1 was shown to be expressed in testis and brain, as well as in several leukemic cell lines, and is thought to primarily function in the control of meiosis. This cyclin binds both Cdk1 and Cdk2 kinases, which give two distinct kinase activities, one appearing in S phase, the other in G2, and thus regulate separate functions in cell cycle. This cyclin was found to bind to important cell cycle regulators, such as Rb family proteins, transcription factor E2F1, and the Kip/Cip family of CDK-inhibitor proteins.

Interactions 

Cyclin-A1 interacts with:

 CDC20,
 Cyclin-dependent kinase 2,
 E2F1,
 GNB2L1,
 GPS2,
 MYBL2, and
 Retinoblastoma protein.

References

Further reading 

 
 
 
 
 
 
 
 
 
 
 
 
 
 
 
 
 
 
 

Cell cycle regulators